Judith Mary Lucy (born 25 March 1968) is an Australian comedian and actress, known primarily for her stand-up comedy. Lucy joined the team of the ABC's The Weekly with Charlie Pickering in 2019.

Early life 
Lucy's adoptive parents emigrated from Ireland to Perth in the early 1950s, and she was born and raised in Perth. She is the sister of Australian writer and scholar Niall Lucy. Lucy attended Curtin University and studied theatre, moving to Melbourne at the age of 20.

At 25, she discovered she was adopted and later made contact with her biological mother. Lucy is quoted as saying they have a good relationship.

Career

Live comedy
After arriving in Melbourne, Lucy embarked on a career as a stand-up comedian, leading to a series of highly successful one-woman shows, including No Waiter I Ordered the Avocado (1991), King Of The Road (1995), An Impossible Dream (1996), The Show (1998), The Show 2 (1999), Colour Me Judith (2000), I'm Going to Learn How to Fly (2001), I Failed! (2006) (based on her short-lived career on the 2Day FM breakfast show), and Judith Lucy's Not Getting Any Younger (2009). 

Her 1998 comedy album King of the Road was nominated for an ARIA Award. 

Lucy also co-starred with Denise Scott and Lynda Gibson in the award-winning stage spectaculars Comedy Is Not Pretty (1999) and Comedy Is Still Not Pretty (2003).
Lucy toured nationally in 2009 with her ninth one-woman show, Judith Lucy's Not Getting Any Younger. The tour visited Sydney twice for the return season along with Melbourne, Brisbane, Canberra, Newcastle, Wollongong, Adelaide, Perth and regional cities Albury, Warragul and Ballarat. That tour marked 20 years in stand up comedy since she performed her first gig in Melbourne at Le Joke in 1989. 

In 2012, Lucy took her new show Nothing Fancy to Perth, Brisbane, Sydney and regional NSW. In 2013, Lucy and Denise Scott teamed up for a new live show The Spiral which made its debut at the Melbourne Comedy Festival before touring nationally.

In 2015, Lucy performed a solo show Ask No Questions of the Moth which won the award for best live comedy at the 2015 Helpmann Awards. The show toured nationally in 2015-2016. The show was inspired by her memories of 2014 which she described as "the worst year of my life", a year which included the death of her brother Niall.

In 2017, Lucy teamed up with Denise Scott again for a new live show entitled Disappointments which commenced touring Australia in March 2017. The show was performed in Melbourne in April 2017 as part of that city's annual International Comedy Festival.

In February 2019, Lucy was appointed one of three Fringe Ambassadors for the Adelaide Fringe, and presented her show Judith Lucy Vs Men there.

Film and television
Lucy has appeared on The Mick Molloy Show, Rove, Saturday Night Rove, Studio 10, The Project and Hughesy, We Have a Problem.

In 1993, Judith joined the cast of the live ABC TV comedy The Late Show. She has since co-starred with Mick Molloy in two movies, Crackerjack (2002) and Bad Eggs (2003), the latter directed by Tony Martin (both Martin & Molloy were fellow cast-members on The Late Show). Lucy also appeared on the short-lived and controversial The Mick Molloy Show. 

In August 2009, Lucy began appearing on Rove, replacing Dave Hughes after he left the show, remaining a regular cast member until the program ended three months later in November 2009. 
In 2011, she appeared in a series Judith Lucy's Spiritual Journey on ABC Television, directed by her old friend and Late Show colleague Tony Martin. 

In 2012, Lucy was the patron of Perth's annual Revelation Film Festival, and had a small role in the film The Sapphires.
In July 2013, Lucy teamed up with film critic Jason Di Rosso to serve as temporary hosts for ABC TV's At the Movies.

In 2015, the series Judith Lucy Is All Woman, a look at the role of women in present-day Australian society, aired on ABC Television.

In 2019, Lucy joined the cast of The Weekly with Charlie Pickering in series 5, replacing Kitty Flanagan and cast as a "wellness expert" to look at some of the products offered by the booming wellness industry.

In August 2019, Lucy resumed her role as the "voice of reason" on Rove McManus' new comedy show on Network Ten Saturday Night Rove. The show was cancelled on 31 August 2019.

Radio
Lucy was a regular on Mick Molloy and Tony Martin's radio show Martin/Molloy (1995–1998), and over the following decade she co-hosted several popular radio programmes, including Triple J's The Ladies Lounge (with Helen Razer) (1997) and the Today Network's Foxy Ladies (with Kaz Cooke) (1998), The Friday Shout (with Peter Rowsthorn) (2003), The Judith Lucy Show (with Peter Helliar) (2004) and The Arvo (with Peter Helliar) (2005).

Books 
In May 2008, Lucy's first book The Lucy Family Alphabet was published. Lucy wrote the book about life with her Irish-born adoptive parents and not knowing she was adopted until age 25. The book has been described as "a riotous take on Lucy's childhood  [and] the lunatics who made her who she is today".

In October 2012, her second book (and follow-up to her earlier memoir) Drink, Smoke, Pass Out was published. One reviewer called it both funny and sad but "worth it ... because like a true champion Judith finds a way through her self-absorbed mire. Not in a righteous religious way but in an honest way."

Discography

Albums

Awards and nominations

ARIA Music Awards
The ARIA Music Awards are a set of annual ceremonies presented by Australian Recording Industry Association (ARIA), which recognise excellence, innovation, and achievement across all genres of the music of Australia. They commenced in 1987. 

! 
|-
| 1999 || King of the Road || ARIA Award for Best Comedy Release ||  || 
|-

References

External links 
 
Judith Lucy at Token Artists (archive)
The Lucy Family Alphabet, Author:  Judith Lucy
Transcript of Radio Ha Ha episode featuring Judith Lucy
 

1968 births
Living people
Australian stand-up comedians
Australian television personalities
Women television personalities
Triple J announcers
Australian women comedians
Australian women radio presenters
Helpmann Award winners
Actresses from Perth, Western Australia
Curtin University alumni